In the Internet addressing architecture, the Internet Engineering Task Force (IETF) and the Internet Assigned Numbers Authority (IANA) have reserved various Internet Protocol (IP) addresses for special purposes.

IPv4

IPv4 designates special usage or applications for various addresses or address blocks:

IPv6

IPv6 assigns special uses or applications for various IP addresses:

See also
 Bogon filtering
 Martian packet
 Classless Inter-Domain Routing (CIDR)

References

External links
 IANA IPv4 Special-Purpose Address Registry
 IANA IPv6 Special-Purpose Address Registry

IP addresses